Padin may refer to:

 Pablo Padin, Argentinian musician, member of God Save the Queen (band)
 Padín, Spanish surname
 Roberto Garrido Padin (born 1945), Brazilian catholic bishop